Rodrigo Marte de la Rosa (born 3 August 1997) is a Dominican Republic boxer. He competed in the men's flyweight event at the 2020 Summer Olympics.

References

External links
 

1997 births
Living people
Dominican Republic male boxers
Olympic boxers of the Dominican Republic
Boxers at the 2020 Summer Olympics
Place of birth missing (living people)
Pan American Games gold medalists for the Dominican Republic
Pan American Games medalists in boxing
Boxers at the 2019 Pan American Games
Medalists at the 2019 Pan American Games
21st-century Dominican Republic people